Lal Singh was the commander and wazir of Sikh Empire.

Lal Singh may also refer to:
Lal Singh Dil
Lal Singh (politician)
Laal Singh Chaddha